Pentadic numerals are a notation for presenting numbers, usually by inscribing in wood or stone. The notation has been used in Scandinavia, usually in conjunction with runic calendars and inscriptions in runes.

Notation 

The notation is similar to the older Roman numerals for numbers 1 to 9 (I, II, III, IV, V, VI, VII, VIII, IX). Unlike the Roman notation, there are only symbols for numbers one ("I") and five ("U"), protruding off the side of a vertical stroke, or stem, which has no numeric value by itself. In some inscriptions the notches are placed horizontally on a vertical stem or stav of the rune; on other inscriptions the stave is horizontal and the "I" and inverted "U" rise off of it.

The number 4 is represented by four vertical lines on the horizontal stem, 5 is represented by what looks like a half-turned letter U, resembling the letter "P" in combination with the stem. 10 is represented by two turned U's opposing each other. More numbers up to 19 or 20, can be represented by a combination of I's and U's branching off of a stem, similar to how Roman numerals are represented by combinations of I's and V's.

Dating and extent of use 
The widest use of the notation is in presenting the Golden Numbers, 1–19 on Runic calendars (also known as clogs). The numbers are commonly found in Modern Age and possibly Early Modern Age calendar sticks. It is unknown if they were in use in the Middle Ages, let alone in the Viking Age. On older runic calendars, a different notation for representing the Golden Numbers was used; the 16 runes of Younger Futhark represented the numbers from 1 to 16 and three ad hoc, runes were improvised for the numbers 17, 18, and 19. For example, the Computus Runicus manuscript, originally from 1328, but collected and published by the Dane Ole Worm (1588–1654), uses this futhark notation, and not the pentadic numerals under discussion here.

Positional notation 
In some peculiar instances runic numbers have been used as numerals in a base ten positional system, replacing the Arabic numerals. It is unknown if this use existed before the 19th century.

The oldest authenticated use of this notation is in the notes of an 18 year-old journeyman tailor, Edward Larsson, that are dated to 1885 in pentadic runes. A copy of the note was first published by the Institute for Dialectology, Onomastics and Folklore Research in Umeå in 2004.

This positional notation however appears on two unrelated sets of rune stones allegedly discovered in North America. The first is the Kensington Runestone found in 1898; the second are the three Spirit Pond runestones found in 1971. All refer to pre-Columbian Norse exploration of the Americas.

The authors of the North American rune stones do not seem to understand the positional notation or the concept of zero. The rune for 10 is used interchangeably for 0, 10, and <1,0> with little consistency. The inscription stone from Spirit Pond contains the sequences ahr:011 and ahr:00, which have been read as year 1011 and year 1010 respectively. It is unclear if the notation can represent all numbers unambiguously; for example, it may not be possible to distinguish 1010 from 100.

See also 
 Biquinary
 Ogham
 Pental system
 Runic calendar

Footnotes

References

Further reading 
 
 

Numerals
Modern runic writing